The 1973–74 Sussex County Football League season was the 49th in the history of Sussex County Football League a football competition in England.

Division One

Division One featured 13 clubs which competed in the division last season, along with two new clubs, promoted from Division Two:
Portfield
Shoreham

League table

Division Two

Division Two featured nine clubs which competed in the division last season, along with two new clubs, relegated from Division One:
Burgess Hill Town
Three Bridges

League table

References

1973-74
S